Fukada (written: 深田 lit. "muddy field") is a Japanese surname. Notable people with the surname include:

, American physician
, Japanese writer and mountaineer
, Japanese actress and singer
, Japanese photojournalist
, Japanese photographer

Japanese-language surnames